The 2020–21 Southeast Missouri State Redhawks men's basketball team represented Southeast Missouri State University in the 2020–21 NCAA Division I men's basketball season. The Redhawks, led by first-year head coach Brad Korn, played their home games at the Show Me Center in Cape Girardeau, Missouri as members of the Ohio Valley Conference.

Previous season
The Redhawks finished the 2019–20 season 7–24, 3–15 in OVC play to finish in last place. They failed to qualify for the OVC tournament.

On March 3, head coach Rick Ray was fired. He finished at Southeast Missouri State with a five-year record of 51–104. On March 23, the school named former Kansas State assistant coach Brad Korn the new head coach.

Roster

Schedule and results 

|-
!colspan=12 style=| Regular season

|-
!colspan=12 style=| OVC tournament
|-

|-

Source

References

Southeast Missouri State Redhawks men's basketball seasons
Southeast Missouri State Redhawks
Southeast Missouri State Redhawks men's basketball
Southeast Missouri State Redhawks men's basketball